AMC is an English-language online newspaper published in Botswana by Africa Media Corporation. Established in 2020, it features articles in the fields of politics, foreign affairs, business and the economy, culture, law, technology, and science.

See also 

 Botswana Guardian
 BusinessTech
 Daily Maverick
 Daily News Botswana

References

External links 

 

English-language newspapers published in Africa
Newspapers published in Botswana
Publications established in 2020
Newspapers established in 2020